John "Johnny" Borneman III (born June 30, 1977) is an American stock car racing driver. He last competed part-time in the ARCA Menards Series West, driving for his team in the No. 8 Chevrolet.

Racing career

Personal life
Borneman was born in Ramona, California. His father is John Borneman Jr., a Whelen All-American Series champion who also competed in the NASCAR Cup, Truck, and West Series like his son.

He finances his racing career with the money he makes from his construction business.

Motorsports career results

NASCAR
(key) (Bold – Pole position awarded by qualifying time. Italics – Pole position earned by points standings or practice time. * – Most laps led. ** – All laps led.)

Nextel Cup Series

Nationwide Series

Camping World Truck Series

ARCA Re/Max Series
(key) (Bold – Pole position awarded by qualifying time. Italics – Pole position earned by points standings or practice time. * – Most laps led.)

ARCA Menards Series West

 Season still in progress

References

External links
 

1977 births
Sportspeople from San Diego County, California
ARCA Menards Series drivers
NASCAR drivers
Living people
Racing drivers from California
People from Ramona, San Diego County, California